Cerro Gordo ("Fat Hill" in Spanish) may refer to:

Places

Mexico
Cerro Gordo (Mexibús), a BRT station in Ecatepec, Mexico
Cerro Gordo, mountain north of Teotihuacan
Cerro Gordo, Sierra Madre Occidental

Puerto Rico
 Cerro Gordo, Aguada, Puerto Rico, a barrio
 Cerro Gordo, Añasco, Puerto Rico, a barrio
 Cerro Gordo, Bayamón, Puerto Rico, a barrio
 Cerro Gordo, Moca, Puerto Rico, a barrio
 Cerro Gordo, San Lorenzo, Puerto Rico, a barrio

Spain
 Cerro Gordo, a dormant volcano in the Campo de Calatrava Volcanic Field

United States
Cerrogordo, Florida
Cerro Gordo, Illinois
Cerro Gordo, Minnesota
Cerro Gordo Township, Minnesota
Cerro Gordo, North Carolina
Cerro Gordo, Tennessee
Cerro Gordo County, Iowa
Cerro Gordo, California, east of the Owens Valley
The Cerro Gordo Mines of Inyo County, California
Cerro Gordo River, a branch of New River (Broward County, Florida)

Other
The Battle of Cerro Gordo in the Mexican–American War